Uranotaenia (Pseudoficalbia) srilankensis is a species of zoophilic mosquito belonging to the genus Uranotaenia. It is endemic to Sri Lanka, and first documented from Peradeniya.

References

External links
Notes on the Genus Uranotaenia
Uranotaenia srilankensis, a new species of the subgenus Pseudoficalbia from Sri Lanka (Diptera: Culicidae).
The biology and immature stages of Uranotaenia (Pseudoficalbia) srilankensis Peyton (Diptera: Culicidae)

srilankensis
Insects described in 1974